The Quick and the Dead is a 1987 American made-for-television Western film based on the 1973 novel by Louis L'Amour, directed by Robert Day and starring Sam Elliott, Tom Conti, Kate Capshaw, Kenny Morrison and Matt Clark.

Plot
In Wyoming Territory in 1876, Duncan McKaskel, his wife Susanna, and their 12-year-old son Tom are travelling West to start a new life. They have left a cholera-stricken wagon train and arrive in a small, dilapidated town, where they meet villainous "Doc" Shabbitt and ask for directions. He suggests they stay in a deserted local building, but McKaskel senses danger, so they leave. Shabbitt steals two of their horses.

Con Vallian is chasing a mixed-race Indian, the latest recruit to Shabbitt's gang whom, it transpires, he has tracked for hundreds of miles for personal reasons. Vallian witnesses the homesteader's encounter with Shabbitt and arrives at the McKaskel's wagon during supper. He notifies them their horses have been stolen. Against Susanna's advice, Duncan rides into town and tries to reclaim the horses. An intense gunfight ensues when Vallian, who has secretly followed him, shoots some of the Shabbitt gang. When Doc Shabbitt finds that his son, who was about to shoot McKaskel in the back, has been killed, he vows to pursue the family and seek revenge.

Susanna, Duncan, and Tom flee in their covered wagon, trying to outrun their pursuers. Vallian continues to help protect them from Shabbitt and his gang. Vallian manages to kill the bandits one at a time, but a remaining four maintain their pursuit. Vallian is obviously attracted to Susanna, and she to him. Following a moment of high drama, she succumbs to his advances, and they share a passionate kiss. McKaskel never learns of the kiss, but several times he tells Vallian, who is critical of his apparent pacifism, to back off. In an encounter with Indians, Susanna learns that her brother, an army officer, has likely been killed at the Battle of the Little Bighorn.

Out hunting, Vallian is ambushed and shot by the Indian. McKaskel removes the bullet, but Vallian runs a high fever and falls on the trail. He is rescued and nursed back to health by Susanna.

Eventually, they arrive at the small cabin Susanna's brother had built for them, on the spread where they intended to raise cattle. The family begins settling in the house, but Shabbitt and his gang arrive for their revenge. A showdown ensues in which Vallian and the McKaskels triumph. Vallian bids farewell to the family and leaves to resume his solitary life.

Cast
 Sam Elliott as Con Vallian
 Tom Conti as Duncan McKaskel
 Kate Capshaw as Susanna McKaskel
 Kenny Morrison as Tom McKaskel
 Matt Clark as "Doc" Shabbitt
 Jerry Potter as "Red" Hayle
 Patrick Kilpatrick as The Ute
 Billy Streater as Ike Mantle  
 Del Shores as Purdy Mantle
 Jeffrey Meyer as "Butcher" McCloud
 R.L. Tolbert as Johnny Dobbs
 Kurt D. Lott as Lenny Shabitt, Doc's Son
 Larry Sellers as Running Wolf
 Bill Stedman as The Bartender 
 Hardy Rawls as Joy, The Blacksmith

Production
Filming locations include Coconino National Forest, Kaibab National Forest, Wupatki National Monument and Sedona, Arizona.

References

External links
 
 
 

1987 television films
1987 Western (genre) films
1980s American films
1980s English-language films
American Western (genre) television films
Films based on American novels
Films based on Western (genre) novels
Films based on works by Louis L'Amour
Films directed by Robert Day
Films scored by Steve Dorff
Films set in Wyoming
Films shot in Arizona
HBO Films films